The 1926–27 Arkansas Razorbacks men's basketball team represented the University of Arkansas in the 1926–27 college basketball season. The Razorbacks played their home games in Schmidt Gymnasium in Fayetteville, Arkansas. It was Francis Schmidt's fourth season as head coach of the Hogs and the program's fourth season overall. The Razorbacks won the Southwest Conference regular season championship with a record of 8–2 and 14–2 overall, Arkansas's second of five straight conference titles.

Future Arkansas football and basketball coach Glen Rose, Harold Steele, and Tom Pickell were all First-Team All-SWC players for the season.

Schedule and Results
Schedule retrieved from HogStats.com.

Schedule and Results
Schedule retrieved from HogStats.com.

References

Arkansas Razorbacks
Arkansas Razorbacks men's basketball seasons